Alma Andrea Meza Carmona (born 13 August 1994) is a Mexican model and beauty pageant titleholder who was crowned Miss Universe 2020. Since winning the title, she became the third Mexican woman to be crowned Miss Universe. Meza holds the record of the shortest completed reign in Miss Universe history to date.

She had previously been crowned Mexicana Universal 2020 and Miss Mexico 2017, and placed as the first runner-up at Miss World 2017.

Early life and education
Meza was born on 13 August, 1994 in Chihuahua City to parents Alma Carmona and Santiago Meza. She grew up in Chihuahua City as the eldest of three daughters, and is of partial Chinese descent. After completing secondary school, Meza enrolled in the Autonomous University of Chihuahua, where she studied software engineering. She graduated with her degree in 2017, and subsequently began working in Mexico as a software engineer in addition to her career as a model.

Pageantry

Miss Mexico 2017
Meza began her pageantry career in 2016, after she was selected to represent Chihuahua at Miss World Mexico 2016. This was the first edition of the pageant after the Nuestra Belleza México competition lost its license for Miss World. In the pageant, Meza advanced to the top sixteen, then the top ten, and ultimately the top five. After reaching the top five, Meza was one of the two contestants awarded a crown, being crowned as Miss Mexico 2017. Ana Girault, representing Mexico City, was crowned Miss Mexico 2016 and given the opportunity to represent Mexico at Miss World 2016, while Meza was given the opportunity to represent Mexico at Miss World 2017. Also, Meza won the sports challenge at the competition.

Miss World 2017

As the winner of Miss Mexico 2017, Meza represented Mexico at the 67th edition of Miss World 2017, held on 18 November 2017 at Sanya City Arena in Sanya, China. In the pre-pageant activities, Meza won group sixteen of the Head-to-Head Challenge, which gave her direct entry into the top forty. Additionally, she placed as the fourth runner-up in the talent competition.

During the finals of the competition, Meza advanced from the top forty into the top fifteen, top ten, and top five. After reaching the top five, Julia Morley announced Meza as the first runner-up behind the winner, Manushi Chhillar from India. In addition to her first runner-up finish, Meza was additionally crowned Miss World Americas, placing her within the 2017 Miss World Continental Queens of Beauty.

Mexicana Universal 2020
In 2020, Meza was crowned Mexicana Universal Chihuahua 2020, allowing her to represent Chihuahua at Mexicana Universal 2020. During pre-pageant activities, Meza won six challenges, including the sports challenge. The final was held on 29 November 2020 in Querétaro City. Meza advanced to the top fifteen and top ten, ultimately being crowned Mexicana Universal 2020.

Miss Universe 2020
As Mexicana Universal, Meza represented Mexico at the Miss Universe 2020 pageant. The final of the competition was held on May 16, 2021, at the Seminole Hard Rock Hotel & Casino Hollywood in Hollywood, Florida, after being postponed from late 2020 to May 2021 due to the COVID-19 pandemic. Meza advanced from the initial pool of 74 contestants to the top 21, then the top ten, and finally the top five, where she was crowned the winner by the outgoing titleholder Zozibini Tunzi of South Africa. Following her win, she became the third Mexican woman to win the crown, following Lupita Jones in 1991 and Ximena Navarrete in 2010.

With Meza's victory at Miss Universe 2020, this  marked Mexico's second consecutive year in the top 3 after Sofía Aragón, Mexicana Universal 2019, finished as the second runner-up at Miss Universe 2019. Meza also surpassed Brook Lee's record of being the oldest to win Miss Universe by winning at the age of 26 years and 276 days. This record was later broken during the Miss Universe 2022 competition when R'Bonney Gabriel won at the age of 28 years and 300 days.

In her capacity as Miss Universe, Meza traveled to various cities within the United States, South Africa, Puerto Rico, Dominican Republic, The Bahamas, Israel, and her home country of Mexico.

After winning Miss Universe, Meza was succeeded as Mexicana Universal by Débora Hallal, who was appointed Mexicana Universal 2021.

On December 13, 2021, Meza crowned Harnaaz Sandhu of India as her successor at the Universe Dome, Eilat, Israel, marking the end of the shortest completed reign in Miss Universe history of 211 days.

References

External links

1994 births
Autonomous University of Chihuahua alumni
Living people
Mexican beauty pageant winners
Mexican female models
Mexicana Universal winners
Miss Universe winners
Miss Universe 2020 contestants
Miss World 2017 delegates
People from Chihuahua City
Software engineers